Robert Nelson Pollard (June 16, 1880 – May 24, 1954) was a United States district judge of the United States District Court for the Eastern District of Virginia.

Education and career

Born in King and Queen County, Virginia, Pollard attended the University of Virginia School of Law and received a Bachelor of Laws from the University of Richmond School of Law in 1903. He was in private practice in Richmond, Virginia from 1904 to 1930. He was a Judge of the Law and Equity Court of Richmond from 1930 to 1936.

Federal judicial service

On February 20, 1936, Pollard was nominated by President Franklin D. Roosevelt to a new seat on the United States District Court for the Eastern District of Virginia created by 49 Stat. 508. He was confirmed by the United States Senate on February 27, 1936, and received his commission the same day. He assumed senior status due to a certified disability on April 22, 1947. Pollard served in that capacity until his death on May 24, 1954, in Richmond.

References

Sources
 

1880 births
1954 deaths
Judges of the United States District Court for the Eastern District of Virginia
United States district court judges appointed by Franklin D. Roosevelt
20th-century American judges
People from King and Queen County, Virginia
University of Virginia School of Law alumni
University of Richmond School of Law alumni